Justin Shubow is an American architectural critic who currently serves as the president of the National Civic Art Society, a nonprofit organization that advocates and promotes public art and architecture in the classical tradition. He was a member of the United States Commission of Fine Arts from 2018 to 2021 and served as its chairman in 2021, being the first Jew to hold that position.

Biography 
Shubow graduated, magna cum laude, from Columbia University in 1999, where he was a member of the Columbia University Marching Band, and received a master’s degree in philosophy from the University of Michigan and a J.D. degree from Yale Law School.

He served as an instructor at the University of Michigan and Yale University teaching courses in philosophy. He also served as an editor of The Forward newspaper and Commentary magazine.

Architectural Advocacy 
Shubow has been a proponent of Classical architecture and is critical of Brutalist architecture. He is known for his criticism and lobbying against Frank Gehry's Dwight D. Eisenhower Memorial. He is also reported to have played a key role in the passage of the Executive Order "Promoting Beautiful Federal Civic Architecture," which encouraged traditional and classical architecture for federal buildings.

In November 2018, he was nominated by President Donald Trump to serve on the United States Commission of Fine Arts, an independent federal agency that oversees the design and construction of all buildings, monuments, and memorials in Washington, D.C.

On January 25, 2021, he was named chairman of the commission, succeeding Earl A. Powell III, former director of the National Gallery of Art.

In May 2021, he was removed from the commission by President Joe Biden. Shubow issued a statement to the White House, saying, "As chairman of the US Commission of Fine Arts, I was shocked and dismayed to learn that three of my fellow commissioners, along with myself, have been asked to resign or be terminated by the President. In the Commission’s 110-year history, no commissioner has ever been removed by a President, let alone the commission’s chairman. Any such removal would set a terrible precedent.”

Personal life 
He is married to Idris Leppla, an Assistant Professor of Psychiatry and Behavioral Sciences at Johns Hopkins University. He is of Jewish descent.

References

External links
Justin Shubow's website
 

Living people
Columbia College (New York) alumni
University of Michigan alumni
Yale Law School alumni
Year of birth missing (living people)
Trump administration personnel
Biden administration personnel